Viviana Torres (born 19 December 1993) is a Chilean football player who plays as a forward for Fernández Vial and Chile Women's National Football Team.

Club career 
In 2019, Torres joined Delfín SC in Ecuador with fellow Chilean player Daniela Ceballos. Shortly, both players returned to Chile, and joined Universidad of Concepción.

In 2022, Torres rejoined Fernández Vial.

International career 
Torres debuted for Chile on 23 October 2021 in a friendly game against Colombia.

References 

Living people
1993 births
Chilean women's footballers
Women's association football forwards
Chile women's international footballers